The Sungai Siput railway station is a Malaysian train station located at and named after the town of Sungai Siput, Perak.

Location and locality 
The station is located near the Sungai Siput Post Office around Jalan Harmoni, which also runs parallel beside Federal Route 1. 

This station is purposed to serve the town of Sungai Siput as well as nearby settlements around the town, however infrequent service cause passengers to use nearby stations, either Kuala Kangsar or Ipoh station instead.

External links
Sungai Siput Railway Station

KTM ETS railway stations
Kuala Kangsar District
Railway stations in Perak